Einar Andersson (born Ernst Ejnar Andersson 13 July 1909 – 11 January 1989) was a Swedish tenor opera singer.

Andersson was born in Västerås. He studied at the Royal Swedish Academy of Music in Stockholm. He first performed on stage in an opera in Stockholm in 1938. In 1939 Anderson became a soloist in the Royal Swedish Opera. In 1958 he toured the Soviet Union.

He died January 11, 1989 in Åseda in Uppvidinge.

Filmography
Hemtrevnad i kasern (Cosiness In Barracks) (1941)
Eldfågeln (The Firebird — film of the ballet) (1952)

References
 Театральная энциклопедия. Гл. ред. С. С. Мокульский. Т. 1 — М.: Советская энциклопедия, 1961, 1214 стб. с илл., 12 л. илл. (Theatrical Encyclopedia. Hd. Ed. SS Mokulsky. T. 1 - Moscow: Soviet Encyclopedia, 1961)

Swedish operatic tenors
1909 births
1989 deaths
20th-century Swedish male opera singers
People from Västerås